Epitaph for a Spy is a 1938 spy novel by Eric Ambler.

Plot
Josef Vadassy is a Hungarian refugee of uncertain statehood. Born in Szabadka, as a result of the Treaty of Trianon he is no longer a citizen of Yugoslavia but a persona non grata. While on holiday in the south of France, he sends a roll of camera film for development, however it turns out to contain pictures which are not his, of nearby naval defences. He is arrested on suspicion of spying. The police realise that Vadassy did not take the pictures, but that someone else at his hotel must have an identical camera, a Zeiss Ikon Contax. Vadassy is told to return to the hotel to find the real spy, with the threat that should he fail to do so, he will be deported, which could mean death.

Context
The novel was published and is set just before World War II. Vadassy is a typical Ambler protagonist, sympathetic but out of his depth. The plight of stateless individuals is a recurring theme in Ambler's novels. The hotel setting makes the novel similar to a country house whodunit.

The book contained early descriptions of German concentration camps, based on Ambler's conversations with refugees and reading of left-wing newspapers.

The book was serialised in the Daily Express and made Ambler a household name.

Adaptations
The novel was filmed as Hotel Reserve in 1944, starring James Mason. It was adapted for television in 1953, with Peter Cushing as Josef Vadassy, and again in 1963 with Colin Jeavons as Vadassy.

References

British spy novels
Novels by Eric Ambler
1938 British novels
Hodder & Stoughton books
Novels set in France